Sir Charles Johnston, 1st Baronet (3 May 1848 – 10 April 1933), was Lord Mayor of London for 1914 –15.

Prior to serving as Lord Mayor he was an Alderman and, in 1910–11, Sheriff of the City of London. He was created a Baronet in January 1916 which became extinct oh his death.

References

1848 births
1933 deaths
20th-century lord mayors of London
20th-century English politicians
Sheriffs of the City of London
Baronets in the Baronetage of the United Kingdom